Amir Arison (born March 24, 1978) is an American actor, best known for his work as FBI tech expert Aram Mojtabai on NBC’s The Blacklist for ten seasons.

Early life and education 
Arison was born to a Jewish family in Saint Louis, MO to father Ron Arison, a surgeon, and mother Zipora Arison, a psychiatrist. He has one older sibling.

Amir grew up in Fort Lauderdale from the age of 5, where he attended Pine Crest School from kindergarten through his senior year in high school.  With an early penchant for theatre, Arison received the school's Drama Club Award in the 6th grade, as well as the Founder’s Council Fine Arts Award in Acting his Senior year. Amir performed with the Fort Lauderdale-based professional improv group ComedySportz throughout  his junior and senior years.

He received his SAG card, debuting in a Sonic Drive-In commercial when he was 16.

He attended Columbia University, where he earned a BA in English.

Television 
In addition to his role as Aram Mojtabai on NBC’s The Blacklist,  Arison’s television credits include recurring & guest starring roles on American Horror Story, Hulu's Ramy, Law & Order: SVU, Showtime's Billions, and Bull on CBS, NCIS, Homeland, Girls, Blue, Once Upon a Time in Wonderland, Warner Brothers' H+.

Filmography 
Arison’s film highlights include: 20 Weeks, Jane Wants a Boyfriend, Big Words, Tom McCarthy’s The Visitor,  Amy Heckerling's Vamps, Nia Vardalos' I Hate Valentine's Day, and Merry Friggin' Christmas.

References

External links
 
 Broadway Bio

Living people
1978 births
American male film actors
American male television actors
Male actors from St. Louis
21st-century American male actors
American people of Israeli descent
Jewish American male actors
Columbia College (New York) alumni
21st-century American Jews
Pine Crest School alumni